Michael James Bowler (born 8 September 1987) is a former English professional footballer. Now a right-back, he started his career as a central midfielder.

Career
Born in Glossop in Derbyshire, Bowler began his career at Stockport County, making his debut in a League Cup match against Derby County on 22 August 2006. His final match for Stockport was a 1–1 draw at Bradford City on 24 November 2007. He signed for Northwich Victoria on 4 January 2008, making his debut for the club the following day in a 2–1 home defeat by Aldershot Town. On 1 July 2008 he was signed by Kidderminster Harriers on a one-year contract. He was released in February 2009.

For the start of the 2009–10 season Bowler joined North West Counties League Premier Division club, New Mills. At the start of the 2014–15 season he signed for his home town club, Glossop North End.

References

External links

1987 births
Living people
People from Glossop
Footballers from Derbyshire
English footballers
Stockport County F.C. players
English Football League players
Northwich Victoria F.C. players
National League (English football) players
Kidderminster Harriers F.C. players
Glossop North End A.F.C. players
New Mills A.F.C. players
Association football fullbacks